Fisher Body was an automobile coachbuilder founded by the Fisher brothers in 1908 in Detroit, Michigan. A division of General Motors for many years, in 1984 it was dissolved to form other General Motors divisions. Fisher & Company (originally Alloy Metal Products) continues to use the name.  The name and its iconic "Body by Fisher" logo were well known to the public, as General Motors vehicles displayed a "Body by Fisher" emblem on their door sill plates until the mid-1990s.

Fisher brothers 

Fisher Body's beginnings trace back to a horse-drawn carriage shop in Norwalk, Ohio, in the late 1800s. Lawrence P. Fisher (1852 Peru, Ohio – 1921, Norwalk, Ohio) and his wife Margaret Theisen (1857 Baden, Germany – 1936 Detroit, Michigan) had a large family of eleven children; seven were sons who would become part of the Fisher Body Company in Detroit. Lawrence and Margaret were married in Sandusky, Ohio, in 1876. Margaret Theisen Fisher lived in Detroit after her husband died.

The Fisher brothers were:
 Frederick John Fisher (1878–1941)
 Charles Thomas Fisher (1880–1963)
 William Andrew Fisher (1886–1969)
 Lawrence P. Fisher (1888–1961)
 Edward F. Fisher (1891–1972)
 Alfred J. Fisher (1892–1963)
 Howard A. Fisher (1902–1942)

History 
In 1904 and 1905, the two eldest brothers, Fred and Charles, came to Detroit where their uncle Albert Fisher had established Standard Wagon Works during the latter part of the 1880s. The brothers found work at the C. R. Wilson Company, a manufacturer of horse-drawn carriage bodies that was beginning to make bodies for automobile manufacturers. With financing from their uncle, on July 22, 1908, Fred and Charles Fisher established the Fisher Body Company. Their uncle soon wanted out, and the brothers obtained the needed funds from businessman Louis Mendelssohn who became a shareholder and director. Soon Charles and Fred Fisher brought their five younger brothers into the business.

Prior to forming the company, Fred Fisher had built the first closed-body coupe, the 1905 Cadillac Osceola at the C. R. Wilson Company. The Osceola was requested by Mr. Leland to determine the feasibility of a car body that was closed to the elements. It was built on the chassis of the 1905 Cadillac Model E. Starting in 1910, Fisher became the supplier of all closed bodies for Cadillac, Buick, Oakland and Oldsmobile.

In the early years of the company, the Fisher Brothers had to develop new body designs because the "horseless carriage" bodies lacked the strength to withstand the vibration of the new motorcars. By 1913, the Fisher Body Company had the capacity to produce 100,000 cars per year and customers included: Ford, Krit, Chalmers, General Motors, and Studebaker. Highly successful, they expanded into Canada, establishing a plant in Walkerville, Ontario. By 1914 their operations had grown to become the world's largest manufacturer of auto bodies. One reason for their success was the development of interchangeable wooden body parts that did not require hand-fitting, as was the case in the construction of carriages. This required the design of new precision woodworking tools.

The Fisher Body and Buick chassis were built in Saint John, New Brunswick, Canada, in the 1920s.

Fisher Body Corporation and General Motors 

In 1916, the company became the Fisher Body Corporation. Its capacity was 370,000 bodies per year and its customers included Abbot, Buick, Cadillac, Chalmers, Chandler, Chevrolet, Church-Field, Elmore, EMF, Ford, Herreshoff, Hudson, Krit, Oldsmobile, Oakland, Packard, Pontiac, Regal, and Studebaker.

The company constructed the now-abandoned Smith, Kinchman & Grylls-designed Fisher Body Plant 21 (commonly misattributed to Albert Kahn, who designed the historic landmark Fisher Building), on Piquette Street, in Detroit, in 1919. The building is now part of the Piquette Avenue Industrial Historic District and is being revived by Detroit developers Greg Jackson and Richard Hosey and architecture firm McIntosh Poris Associates as Fisher 21 Lofts, a mixed-use project combining 433 apartments and commercial spaces. At the time, Fisher had more than 40 buildings encompassing 3,700,000 square feet (344,000 m²) of floor space.

Fisher Body – West Fort & Livernois 
Fisher Body Plant 2 (wood kiln) – St. Antoine
Fisher Body Plant 4 – Oakland Ave.
Fisher Body Plant 12 – 1961 E. Milwaukee
Fisher Body Plant 18 (aka Cadillac Fleetwood Plant) – West End Ave 
Fisher Plant 21 – 700 Piquette
Fisher Plant 23 – 601 Piquette
Fisher Plant 37 – 950 E. Milwaukee at Hastings

In a 1919 deal put together by president William C. Durant, General Motors bought 60% of the company. The Fisher company purchased Fleetwood Metal Body in 1925, and in 1926 was integrated entirely as an in-house coachbuilding division of General Motors. Fisher Body Division was dissolved in 1984, with some of its plants taken over by the newly-created Fisher Guide Division (later Inland Fisher Guide), and the remaining facilities absorbed by other GM operations.

Founded in 1947 by members of the Fisher family, Fisher & Company continues to use the name, with such divisions as Fisher Dynamics.

Extent of operations 
From its beginning in the "horseless carriage shop" in Norwalk, Ohio, to its sale in 1919 and 1926 to General Motors, the Fisher Body Company was built by the Fisher brothers into one of the world's largest manufacturing companies.

The company owned  of timberland and used more wood, carpet, tacks, and thread than any other manufacturer in the world. It had more than 40 plants and employed more than 100,000 people, and pioneered many improvements in tooling and automobile design including closed all-weather bodies.

Fisher Body's contribution to the war effort in WWI and WWII included the production of airplanes and tanks. Alfred J. Fisher was Aircraft Director for Fisher Body. Fisher Body developed the unsuccessful Fisher P-75 Eagle heavy fighter.

Fisher family 
On August 14, 1944, the Fisher brothers resigned from General Motors to devote their time to other interests, including the Fisher Building on West Grand Boulevard in Detroit. The brothers also mounted a bid to take over Hudson Motors, but their tender offer fell short of its market value and the effort was rejected by stockholders.

On January 19, 1972, the last of the Fisher brothers died. The seven brothers donated millions of dollars to schools, churches, and other charitable causes and were active in directing those endeavors.

The Fisher family has continued on in the automotive industry with Fisher Corporation (metal stamping), General Safety (seat belts), and Fisher Dynamics (seat mechanisms & structures), in the U.S., Mexico, China, and India.

On July 22, 2008, Fisher Coachworks, LLC was launched with Gregory W. Fisher, grandson of Alfred J. Fisher, as CEO. The new company was developing a prototype of the GTB-40, a hybrid-electric 40' transit bus developed by Autokinetics of Rochester Hills, Michigan, that uses Nitronic, a stainless steel alloy developed by AK Steel that allows the bus to be half the nominal weight of a standard transit bus and achieve twice the fuel economy.

As of 2010, Fisher Coachworks, LLC went out of business after two years, producing only a single prototype bus. On March 3, 2011, the Michigan Economic Development Corporation received a check for $29,000 for all of Fisher CoachWorks’ remaining assets.

Alfred J. Fisher Jr., an automotive safety pioneer and son of Fisher Body's Alfred J. Fisher Sr., died June 19, 2012.

Mansions in Detroit

Milestones 
 1930 – Slanted windshields for reduced glare
 1933 – "No-Draft" ventilation, also known as Ventiplanes
 1934 – One-piece steel "turret top" roofs
 1935 – Former Durant Motors plant in Lansing, Michigan, opens
 1936 – Dual windshield wipers
 1959 – Developed and produced GM's first unibody car – The 1960 Chevrolet Corvair
 1969 – Fisher's "Side Guard Beam" is introduced. Ternstedt Division merged into Fisher Body.
 1974 – Invented the ignition interlock system
 1974 – Produced GM's first airbag
 1975 – Fisher develops GM's first all-metric vehicle, the Chevrolet Chevette
 1979 – Fisher Northern Ireland established, opens plant in Dundonald, Northern Ireland
 1984 – Fisher Body Division dissolves, with its operations transferred to other GM divisions. These include newly created Fisher Guide Division, Chevrolet-Pontiac-Canada Group, and Buick-Oldsmobile-Cadillac Group.
 1988 – Fisher Guide closes Hamilton/Fairfield, Ohio, facility
 1989 – Fisher Guide merges with Inland Division to become Inland Fisher Guide
 1990 – Inland Fisher Guide closes Elyria, Ohio, facility
 1995 – Inland Fisher Guide absorbed into Delphi Automotive Systems
 2008 – Fisher Coachworks, LLC, officially launches and begins development of the GTB-40 transit bus
 2010 – Fisher Coachworks, LLC, folds and is liquidated the following year.

Other products
Aircraft
 Fisher P-75 Eagle

References

External links 
 Fisher Corporation
 Fisher Body Company Plant No. 21 at Abandoned
 Fisher Body at Car of the Century

Coachbuilders of the United States
Former General Motors subsidiaries
Manufacturing companies based in Detroit
Vehicle manufacturing companies established in 1908
1908 establishments in Michigan
Vehicle manufacturing companies disestablished in 1984
1984 establishments in Michigan
Defunct manufacturing companies based in Michigan